Kremmen is a town in the district of Oberhavel, in Brandenburg, Germany. It is located 15 km (10 miles) west of Oranienburg and 38 km (24 miles) northwest of Berlin. It is known mostly for its castle Ziethen. The local church contains an organ built in 1817 by Tobias Thurley.

Demography

Mayors
Klaus-Jürgen Sasse (SPD) was elected in October 2008 with 53,1 % of the votes.
 
Sebastian Busse (CDU) was elected in November 2016 with 56,9 % of the votes. He started in office in March 2017.

Photogallery

Personalities 

 Richard Dehmel (1863-1920), poet and writer, spent his childhood in Kremmen

References

External links

Localities in Oberhavel